This is a list of MBTA subway stations in Boston and surrounding municipalities. All stations are operated by the Massachusetts Bay Transportation Authority. This list includes all rapid transit, light rail, and bus rapid transit (BRT) stations currently open on the MBTA's subway system. , the system has 153 stops and stations served by the Green, Blue, Red, Orange, and Silver lines. These range in scale from marked stops on the Green and Silver lines with no fixed infrastructure, to sprawling underground complexes at the downtown transfer stations. Stations are typically named after nearby streets, squares, neighborhoods, or institutions—e.g., Park Street, Central, Chinatown, and Airport, respectively. One additional Green Line station, Mystic Valley Parkway, is proposed but not funded.

Boylston and Park Street stations, which opened in 1897, were the first two subway stations in the United States.

Key

Stations

Former stations

Closed without replacement
This listing includes stations that have closed during the MBTA era (since 1964) without replacement by another rapid transit station. Most former stops on Green Line A branch and the outer section of the Green Line E branch, which were merely marked stopping locations rather than platforms, are not listed.

Closed with replacement

This listing includes stations that have closed during the MBTA era (since 1964), but were replaced with another rapid transit station. This includes stations rebuilt nearby on a different routing of the same line (such as Forest Hills when the Washington Street Elevated was replaced with the Southwest Corridor), temporary stations (such as Harvard/Brattle), and stations replaced with Silver Line stops (such as Dover). Most MBTA rapid transit stations have been rebuilt or substantially renovated on the same routing; these are not included.

References

External links
MBTA - Subway

Lists of metro stations
 
Subway
MBTA Subway